Platte Lake is a natural lake in South Dakota, in the United States.

Platte Lake took its name from nearby Platte Creek.

See also
List of lakes in South Dakota

References

Lakes of South Dakota
Lakes of Aurora County, South Dakota